Partecosta fuscobasis is a species of sea snail, a marine gastropod mollusk in the family Terebridae, the auger snails.

Description

Distribution
This marine species occurs in the Persian Gulf

References

 Dance S.P. & Eames F.E. (1966). New molluscs from the recent Hammar formation of South-East Iraq. Proceedings of the Malacological Society of London. 37(1): 35–43.

External links
 Smith E.A. (1877). Descriptions of new species of Conidae and Terebridae. Annals and Magazine of Natural History. ser. 4, 19: 222–231
 Fedosov, A. E.; Malcolm, G.; Terryn, Y.; Gorson, J.; Modica, M. V.; Holford, M.; Puillandre, N. (2020). Phylogenetic classification of the family Terebridae (Neogastropoda: Conoidea). Journal of Molluscan Studies

Terebridae
Gastropods described in 1877